The Milne Baronetcy, of Barnton, Dumfries, was a title in the Baronetage of Nova Scotia. It was created on 19 March 1686 for Robert Milne with remainder to his heirs male whatsoever. Sir Robert Milne purchased Barnton in 1680, but due to financial problems sold it before 1698. On the death of Sir John the baronetcy became either extinct or dormant.

The Milne Baronetcy, of Inveresk in the County of East Lothian, was a title in the Baronetage of the United Kingdom. It was created on 1 November 1876 for Sir Alexander Milne, a distinguished admiral of the Royal Navy. The baronetcy became extinct in 1938 on the death of the second Baronet, Sir Archibald Berkeley Milne.

Milne baronets, of Barnton (1686) 
 Sir Robert Milne, 1st Baronet
 Sir John Milne, Baronet

Milne baronets, of Inveresk (1876) 
Sir Alexander Milne, 1st Baronet (1806–1896)
Sir Archibald Berkeley Milne, 2nd Baronet (1855–1938)

References

Extinct baronetcies in the Baronetage of the United Kingdom